Psilorhynchus gokkyi is a freshwater ray-finned fish, from the Pani Chaung, Ayeyarwaddy River drainage in Myanmar.

References

gokkyi
Fish of Asia
Endemic fauna of India
Fish of Myanmar
Taxa named by Kevin W. Conway
Taxa named by Ralf Britz
Fish described in 2013